José D. Padilla is the 19th President of Valparaiso University. Padilla was most recently vice president, university counsel, and secretary of the University of Colorado system, and previously held similar roles for 15 years at DePaul University.

Early life and education

Padilla was born at a United States Army base in Augsburg, West Germany, and was raised in Toledo, Ohio. He earned a bachelor's degree in elementary education from the University of Toledo and a Juris Doctor from the University of Michigan School of Law.

Career
Padilla began his career practicing law. 

Since 2005, Padilla had served as General Counsel at DePaul University and in 2019 became the secretary of the university. In 2010, he was named one of 100 influential Hispanics in the October 2010 edition of the Hispanic Business magazine.

In July 2020, Padilla was selected to be vice president, general counsel and secretary to the Board of Regents at the University of Colorado.

President of Valparaiso University (2021 - present)

On 30 October 2021, Padilla was inaugurated as the 19th President of Valparaiso University. He is the first Mexican-American and Roman Catholic president to serve the Lutheran university. Upon taking office, Padilla had inherited a university in declining attendance and revenue. In response, he announced a five-year strategic plan called "Uplift Valpo."

Georgia O'Keeffe controversy

On 8 February 2023, Padilla sent a campus-wide email announcing an update to the five-year strategic plan. As part of the plan, a project was now in the works to renovate the existing first-year freshmen residence halls. "We intend to pay for this initiative through a practice we will use for other parts of the strategic plan. We will consider assets and resources that are not core or critical to our educational mission and strategic plan, and reallocate them to support the plan", Padilla had stated in the email. Though he did not specify what the "assets and resources" were, an article from the Chicago Tribune written by Richard Brauer, the founder of Valparaiso University's Brauer Museum of Art, said three paintings were for sale, including one by Georgia O'Keeffe, which had been in the university's collections since 1962. Valparaiso University's Board of Directors authorized Padilla to sell the paintings in October 2022. Brauer announced that if the sales were to go through, he would pull his name from the museum. 

Both Brauer and fellow research professor, John Ruff, said that the sales would breach the 1953 Sloan Trust Agreement, which mandates that any profits from sales must go toward other art pieces. 

The decision also faced backlash from faculty and students, protesting an "erosion of the arts." On 15 February 2023, at least 20 students marched to Heritage Hall to deliver hand-held letters to President Padilla's office. After receiving the letters, Padilla responded by email through University Communications Director Michael Fenton, "The students and I may not agree on this issue. But a university should be an incubator for debate, dialogue, and dissent. If the students are being civil in expressing their heartfelt views, I applaud them for doing so." 

Matt Murphy, the Mayor of Valparaiso, Indiana, said he supported Padilla's decision, saying it would benefit both the university and the city.

Personal life
José Padilla is married to Hilda and the couple has two children, Jacob and Camille. Padilla also has a dog named Coach. Ever since being elected President of Valparaiso University, he and his wife have lived in Valparaiso, Indiana.

References

External links
Valpo profile

Presidents of Valparaiso University
American academic administrators
People from Ohio
Year of birth missing (living people)
Living people
University of Michigan Law School alumni